Kucch Luv Jaisaa is a 2011 Indian drama film. Written and directed by Barnali Shukla, the film stars Shefali Shah and Rahul Bose. Kucch Luv Jaisaa marks the second film that Bose and Shah have acted in together; they also played a married couple in Aparna Sen's 15 Park Avenue (2005). Model Neetu Chandra and television actor Sumeet Raghavan are also in the film. The music is by Pritam.

Plot
A busy housewife and mother, Madhu Saxena is upset when her husband forgets her birthday. As it is on 29 February, her birthday only comes once every four years. She decides to go shopping to celebrate the day and buys a car as well. While resting in a cafe she meets Raghav, a mysterious stranger who she thinks is a private detective. He does not dissuade her from the idea because he is really a wanted forger who has been turned in to the police by his girlfriend Ria. Needing cover until he can leave Mumbai, Raghav pretends to be following an unfaithful husband who is planning to murder his wife. He agrees to accept Madhu's help on the imaginary case. As they pursue the non-existent husband they begin to feel attracted to each other. Events become more complicated when Madhu realizes that he is not a detective and that he has been deceiving her. Finally, Raghav decides to give himself up to the police and Madhu returns to her family.

Cast
 Shefali Shah as Madhu Saxena
 Rahul Bose as Raghav Passport
 Sumeet Raghavan as Shravan Saxena, Madhu's Husband	
 Neetu Chandra as Ria
 Manmeet Singh as Company Manager
 Khurshed Lawyer as a Restaurant Waiter
 Om Puri as Madhu's Father
 Kunal Kumar
 Amin Hajee

Production
Shefali Shah's husband Vipul Amrutlal Shah agreed to serve as the film's producer as a congratulatory gift to her for winning a National Award for The Last Lear. For her role in Kucch Luv Jaisaa  she lost several kilos, dieting and following a strict regimen. She also spent a day in jail with a convicted criminal and talked to his family to get a feel for the role. After rumours of bickering on the set were reported in the press, Shah admitted that she had arguments with Rahul Bose during filming, "but it was nothing serious". The arguments were later revealed to be over her stay in jail because Rahul Bose was worried for her safety.

Soundtrack

Pritam composed the music and lyrics were penned by Irshad Kamil.

Reception

Critical reception
Movie Kucch Luv Jaisaa attracted negative reviews from various critics. Nikhat Kazmi of Times of India rated it with 2.5 out of 5 stars and said - "the lady seems to be so gullible and so easy to fool, it does seem unreal. It takes her eternity to realize her companion's true identity, even though the television keeps blaring out the truth. The duo try hard, but the romance never does light up the screen. Nor do the private lives of the mismatched couple throw up enticing moments that could hold the script together". Bollywood portal FilmiTadka wrote - "Kucch Luv Jaisa starts off as a comedy movie, but takes a serious turn through performances of actors, for this film I would say great performers are thoroughly wasted, the script has various loopholes which could have been covered had the director invested some more time on script front, we at FilmiTadka give it 2 out of five stars." Shubha Shetty-Saha of MidDay wrote in her review - "While busy yawning through this two-hour plus movie, I kept wondering, which women are they talking about? Is there a woman who gets so excited at the sight of a detective that she follows him into a hotel room? Is there a woman out there who thinks she has found some purpose in life, only if she struts around in high heels? If these women do exist, I am glad I haven't met them yet.  
Oh yes, the music was hummable and lyrics were nice".

References

External links
 

2011 films
Films shot in India
2010s Hindi-language films
Indian romantic drama films
2011 romantic drama films
Films featuring songs by Pritam